Tofa, also known as Tofalar or Karagas, is a moribund Turkic language spoken in Russia's Irkutsk Oblast by the Tofalars. Recent estimates for speakers run from 93 people to fewer than 40.

Classification
Tofa is most closely related to the Tuvan language and forms a dialect continuum with it. Tuha and Tsengel Tuvan may be dialects of either Tuvan or Tofa. Tofa shares a number of features with these languages, including the preservation of *d as /d/ (as in hodan "hare" - compare Uzbek quyon) and the development of low tones on historically short vowels (as in *et > èt "meat, flesh").

Alexander Vovin (2017) notes that Tofa and other Siberian Turkic languages, especially Sayan Turkic, have Yeniseian loanwords.

Geographical and demographical distribution

The Tofa, who are also known as the Tofalar or Karagas, are an indigenous people living in southwestern Irkutsk Oblast, in Russia.  The region they inhabit is informally known as Tofalaria.  They are traditionally a nomadic reindeer-herding people, living on or near the Eastern Sayan mountain range. However, reindeer herding has greatly declined since the 20th century, with only one Tofa family continuing the practice .  Recognized by the former USSR in 1926 as one of the "Small Numbered Minorities of the North," (Russian: коренные малочисленные народы Севера, Сибири и Дальнего Востока) the Tofa have special legal status and receive economic support from Russia.  The Tofa population is around 750 people; around 5% of the population spoke Tofa as a first language in 2002, (although that number has likely declined since then, due to the age of the speakers).  Although the population of Tofalaria appears to be growing, the number of ethnic Tofalar seems to be in decline.

Effects of language contact 
Language contact—mainly with Russian speakers—has been extensive since 1926, when the Tofa officially received their "Small Numbered Minorities of the North" status from the USSR (Russian: коренные малочисленные народы Севера, Сибири и Дальнего Востока) and underwent significant cultural, social, and economic changes.  Most notably, this traditionally nomadic, reindeer-herding people have since become sedentary and reindeer herding has all but vanished among the Tofa.  In addition to visiting tax collectors and tourists, many other Russians have come to the Sayan mountain range to live.  Russian migration and intermarriage also has had an effect, according to a citation by Donahoe: "In 1931, of a total population in Tofalaria of 551, approximately 420 (76%) were Tofa, and the remaining 131 (24%) were non-Tofa, predominantly Russian (Mel'nikova 1994:36 and 231). By 1970, the population in Tofalaria had increased to 1368, of whom 498 (36%) were Tofa, and 809 (59%) were Russian (Sherkhunaev 1975:23)."(p. 159)  There were approximately 40 speakers of various fluency levels by 2002, and this number has likely continued to decrease in the intervening time.

Phonology

Vowels
The following table lists the vowels of Tofa. The data was taken from Ilgın and Rassadin.

All vowels except [] can be pharyngealized []. According to Rassadin pharyngealization is realized as creaky voice []. There is also a short [].

Consonants
The following table lists the consonants of Tofa. The data was taken from Ilgın and Rassadin.

Vowel harmony
Many dialects of Tofa exhibit vowel harmony, although this harmony seems to be linked to fluency: as one decreases, so does the other.  Tofa vowel harmony is progressive and based on two features: backness and rounding, and this occurs both root-internal and in affixes.  Enclitics do not appear to trigger backness harmony, and rounding harmony in Tofa has been undergoing changes, and may apply inconsistently.  In some cases this may be due to opaque rules resulting in an apparent "disharmony", especially among speakers of the younger generation.  The complications surrounding Tofa vowel harmony may also be due to fluctuations from language endangerment.  In general, Russian loanwords do not appear to conform to vowel harmony.  Given the increasing quantity of these loanwords, leveling may also be a factor in the inconsistent application of vowel harmony.

Morphology and syntax
Tofa is an agglutinative language with a few auxiliary verbs.  The bare stem of a verb is only used in the singular imperative; other categories are marked by suffixation, including the singular imperative negative.  The Tofa suffix /--sig/ is an especially unusual derivational suffix in that it attaches to any noun to add the meaning 'smelling of + [NOUN]' or 'smelling like + [NOUN]'.  Grammatical number in Tofa includes singular, plural, dual inclusive ('you and me'), and plural inclusive, tense includes the present and past, and aspect includes the perfective and imperfective. Historically suffixes conformed to Tofa vowel harmony rules, but that appears to be changing. Some example sentences are included below to illustrate suffixation:

Plural Perfective

Singular Imperative

Singular Imperative Negative

Pronouns 
Tofa has six personal pronouns:

Tofa also has the pronouns бо "this", тээ "that", кум "who", and чү "what".

Vocabulary
Tofa words are very similar to many other Turkic Languages, but none more than Tuvan. English and Russian are provided for reference.

Writing system
Tofa, although not often written, employs a Cyrillic alphabet:

Tofa has letters that are not present in the Russian alphabet: Ғғ , Әә , Ii , Ққ , Ңң , Өө , Үү , Һһ , and Ҷҷ . Additionally, the letter ъ is sometimes used after a vowel to mark pharyngealization [ˤ], as in эът [ʔɛˤt̪] "meat".

References

Agglutinative languages
Siberian Turkic languages
Languages of Russia
Endangered Turkic languages
Turkic languages